Mana Akasha is a 1974 Oriya film directed by Nitai Palit based on Basant Mahapatra's Novel Jhara Baula. The film portrays socio-economic conflicts in rural Odisha.

Plot 
Sashank Patnaik and Rudra Choudhury are close friends. Rudra's son Bhanu develops love relationship with Sashank's daughter Mala. After demise of Rudra, Sashank tries to acquire the properties of Rudra. In spite of knowing Mala is pregnant and Bhanu is her lover,  Sasank tries to kill Bhanu by giving poison to be the owner of the whole property. But later on Sashank realizes his mistake helps unite Bhanu and Mala.

Cast
Shanti Swaoop Misra... Bhanu Pratap		
Prashant Nanda... Srikant		
Dhira Biswal... Sashank Patnaik		
Gobind Tej... Rudra Choudhury	
Chandana... Mala		
Bhanumati Debi... Mala's mother		
Narendra Behera	
Shyamalendu Bhatacharjee		
Bhim Singh

Soundtrack

References

External links 
 

1974 films
1970s Odia-language films